Bobby Hamilton Racing-Virginia is a disbanded NASCAR racing team. It was owned by four-time Winston Cup winner and 2004 NASCAR Craftsman Truck Series champion Bobby Hamilton until his death on January 7, 2007. Bobby Hamilton Jr. was given ownership after the death of his father, but the younger Hamilton disavowed his relationship with the company. The company was last run by Bobby Hamilton, Sr's widow, Lori Hamilton.

The company, formerly based in Mt. Juliet, Tennessee made plans to move to Martinsville, Virginia after announcing a partnership with Arrington Manufacturing in December 2007 as its new owners were based in the Virginia area, with Mac Bailey, Stacy Compton, Clay Campbell, and Joey Arrington all being Virginians.

History
BHR was originally started by Hamilton and a friend in 1996 in the fledgling Truck Series as an after hours project for Hamilton as well as to serve as development program for Bobby Hamilton Jr.. The elder Hamilton debuted the team in 1997 at Heartland Park Topeka, as the No. 1 Chevrolet sponsored by Southern Pride Trucking. He qualified sixteenth and finished sixth. He ran another race that year at Martinsville Speedway, as the No. 51. He finished fifth in that race. Hamilton ran three races the next year, but suffered mechanical failures in each of them. Meanwhile, Bobby Hamilton Jr., whom the team was originally designed for, was building up a successful career in the ARCA series, then signed on to drive for Sadler Brothers Racing in the Busch Series.

Cup Series
The team made its first start in the Cup Series at the 2000 Pennzoil 400 as the No. 57 Chevrolet. Bobby Hamilton Jr. started thirtieth and finished thirty-third, six laps down. BHR did not run the Cup Series again until 2005, when the No. 04 Dodge ran for two races. Hamilton Sr. had a best finish of 27th at the Allstate 400.

Truck Series

Truck No. 04 history 
The No. 04 truck made its debut as a brand new team in 2004. Bobby Hamilton Jr. was the driver and won the pole at Nashville Superspeedway. With sponsorship from Hyde Park Electronics, Hamilton Jr. won the pole and finished 4th. Hamilton Sr. was the full-time driver in 2005 and won two races total that season and finished 6th in points. Hamilton moved to the No. 18 in 2006, and rookie Scott Lagasse Jr. took over with Dodge Hemi as the sponsor. Lagasse made a total of ten starts and did not finish higher than 18th. Sammy Sanders, David Stremme, and Timothy Peters drove the truck in one race in addition. The team did not run the first half of the 2007 schedule, and ran two races with Joe Ruttman driving, with a best finish of 33rd. Patrick Carpentier drove at Bristol in 2008 for one race. He finished 26th after a late crash.

Truck No. 4 history 
Hamilton began racing the No. 4 in 1999 with sponsorship from Dana Holding Corporation. Driving in five races, Hamilton won the pole at Richmond International Raceway and had a best finish of fourth. Olivier Beretta drove the truck in one race at Heartland Park Topeka, finishing seventeenth. Hamilton drove another five races in 2000, winning at Martinsville Speedway. Donny Morelock made an additional four starts that year, his best finish 19th at Michigan International Speedway. In 2001, Hamilton picked up another win at Darlington Raceway, while Hamilton Jr. made his Truck Series debut at The Milwaukee Mile, finishing 33rd.

In 2002, the No. 4 team began running full-time with Brian Rose as the driver. He began the season with four top-tens in the Perry Construction truck, but was released midway through the season. Hamilton, Hamilton Jr., Joe Ruttman, Rick Bogart, and Ryan Hemphill finished the season in the truck, allowing the team to finish seventeenth in the standings. In 2003, Hamilton Sr. left his Andy Petree Racing Winston Cup ride to drive the No. 4 full-time with sponsorship Square D. He picked up two wins and finished sixth in points. The following season, he won an additional four races (including one at his "home track", Nashville Superspeedway) and was named the Craftsman Truck Series champion.

Hamilton moved to the No. 04 team in 2005. Casey Atwood signed to drive the No. 4 Baileys truck for three races, finishing 11th at Atlanta Motor Speedway. Development driver Timothy Peters took over and drove for seventeen races, finishing in the top-ten twice and was runner-up to Todd Kluever for Rookie of the Year. Chris Fontaine, Erin Crocker, and John Mickel in other races towards the end of the season. Peters was named the team's full-time driver in 2006 and competed in sixteen races in the truck (driving the No. 04 at Michigan when Bobby Labonte drove the No. 4) with a sixth-place finish at The Milwaukee Mile. When he signed a contract with Richard Childress Racing, Peters was removed from the ride and replaced with Dodge driver Chase Miller. He had a best finish of tenth but was released before the 2007 Quaker Steak and Lube 200. 2002 Truck Series Champion Mike Bliss drove the No. 4 in 11 out of the final 14 races of the 2007 season, with Kevin Hamlin supplementing the rest of the schedule. Ruttman raced the 4 at Texas, finishing 27th after a crash. New co-owner Stacy Compton drove the No. 4 full-time in 2008 with sponsorship from various Dodge dealerships across America. After the fall Bristol race, the No. 4 team closed due to a lack of funding.

Truck No. 8 history 
The No. 8 truck debuted in 2001 with Willy T. Ribbs as the driver. In his rookie season, Ribbs drove in 23 races and had three top-twenty finishes, finishing 16th in points, but was replaced by Bill Lester in 2002. He finished seventeenth in points and ended the season with three consecutive top-ten qualifying runs. The following season, Lester won his first career pole at Lowe's Motor Speedway and scored his first top-ten finish at Kansas Speedway. Lester left for Bill Davis Racing at the end of the year.

Chase Montgomery was hired to drive the No. 8 in 2004, which now ran under the moniker BHR2 as Montgomery's father Ray had purchased an ownership stake in the team. Montgomery failed to finish in the top-ten that season and finished 21st in points. He was moved to the No. 18 truck and Deborah Renshaw took his place, bringing sponsorship from Easy Care. She had a best finish of twelfth and earned a 24th-place points finish. A lack of sponsorship would cost her the ride. Montgomery returned to run the 8 at Daytona, and finished 19th. The team was then sold to Julius Curry, and attempted the spring race at Atlanta with Montgomery, but failed to qualify.

Truck No. 18 history 
The 18 truck became the team's first full-time entry into the Truck series. In 1999, Butch Miller was hired to drive the entry full-time with sponsorship from the Dana. Miller had posted four top-tens when he was hired to drive in the Busch Series. Joe Ruttman took over and had nine top-tens in the remaining sixteen races of the season. He opened the 2000 season with three straight poles and a win, and finished sixth in points. In 2001, he won an additional two races and ended the season sixth in points.

Ruttman left with Dana at the end of 2001, and Robert Pressley took over and won in his debut at Daytona. He followed it up with another win at Michigan and a seventh-place points finish. He left for HT Motorsports, and was replaced by Chad Chaffin. With Dickies sponsorship, Chaffin won two poles and finished tenth in points. He followed that up in 2004 with wins at Dover International Speedway and Indianapolis Raceway Park and another tenth-place points finish. Chase Montgomery took over the No. 18 in 2005, but did not post a top-ten and fell to 23rd in the standings. For 2006, Fastenal became the team's primary sponsor and Hamilton was slated to drive it. After three races, Hamilton was diagnosed with neck cancer and was forced to exit the ride. His son Bobby Hamilton Jr. took over for him. Hamilton Jr. won the pole at Martinsville in his first start in the truck and had a total of five top-ten finishes, finishing sixteenth in points. Ken Schrader was announced as the driver of the truck for the 2007 season, and has posted two top-five finishes. Ruttman drove the 18 in one race while filling in for Schrader, before Dennis Setzer took over the truck late in the season. Dennis drove the No. 18 full-time in 2008, with sponsorship from Dodge and Tahoe Smokeless. Setzer scored BHR-VA's final victory that year at the Kroger 250 and finished eighth in points with five top-fives and eight top tens.

Demise
At the close of the 2008 season, Dodge and Tahoe decided to no longer sponsor BHR-VA due to the struggling economy. During Speed's broadcast of the Ford 200 pit reporter Ray Dunlap reported that Setzer was looking for a ride for 2009. Lori Hamilton confirmed on November 24 that BHR-VA would cease all operations at the end of the week.

References

External links
Bobby Hamilton Racing/Virginia Owner Statistics

1996 establishments in Tennessee
2008 disestablishments in Virginia
American auto racing teams
Defunct NASCAR teams
Auto racing teams established in 1996
Auto racing teams disestablished in 2008